Brad Salem (born March 18, 1970) is an American football coach. He is currently the tight ends coach at Memphis. He has previously been an assistant coach at Luther, South Dakota, his alma mater Augustana University, and Michigan State.

Playing career

Salem played high school football at O'Gorman High School in Sioux Falls, South Dakota, where he played quarterback and won a state championship. He started his college career with the Northern Arizona Lumberjacks, where his father was the head coach from 1975–1978. After two seasons playing at Northern Arizona, he transferred to DivisionII Augustana University in Sioux Falls, South Dakota, where he played both quarterback and wide receiver.

Coaching career

Early career

At the conclusion of Salem's playing career at Augustana University in 1993, Salem became the offensive coordinator of the Robinson Sphinx, a football team from Paris, France. That fall, Salem returned to Augustana to coach as a student assistant. From 1994 to 1995, Salem served as a graduate assistant at Michigan State working with the wide receivers and quarterbacks under head coaches George Perles and Nick Saban. He became a high school coach in 1996, serving as the defensive coordinator for Everett High School in Lansing, Michigan. He returned to the college game in 1997, serving as the offensive and recruiting coordinator at Luther College in Decorah, Iowa. After two seasons at Luther, Salem was hired by South Dakota to be their passing game and recruiting coordinator. He and his brother Brent resigned from South Dakota on December 31, 2001. For the 2002 season, Salem returned to coaching high school football and became the quarterbacks coach at the high school where he played, O'Gorman High School.

Augustana University (SD)

Salem returned to both the college game and Augustana in 2003, becoming the quarterbacks coach at his alma mater. Following the 2003 season, he was promoted to offensive coordinator.

On December 3, 2004, Salem was named the 20th coach in Augustana's football history, succeeding longtime head coach Jim Heinitz. In five seasons as Augustana's head coach, Salem posted a record of 31–26, with the team's best seasons coming in 2008 and 2009 at an 8–4 record in each season. He resigned from Augustana on February 19, 2010.

Michigan State

On February 19, 2010, Salem accepted the running backs coach position at Michigan State under head coach Mark Dantonio. During his time as running backs coach, running back Le'Veon Bell rushed for 1,793 yards and 12 touchdowns in 2012. He was shuffled to quarterbacks coach before the 2013 season. Under Salem, quarterback Connor Cook led a threeyear stretch from 2013–2015 where he passed for a combined 9,100 yards and 70 touchdowns as the team went 36–5 in Cook's starts. Prior to the 2019 season, Salem was promoted to offensive coordinator and moved back to running backs coach. The offense was hampered by injuries in 2019, but was able to make improvements in total offense, scoring, and third down conversions from the previous season.  Following the retirement of head coach Mark Dantonio, Salem was not retained by new head coach Mel Tucker.

Memphis

After one season as a senior offensive consultant for Memphis, Salem was promoted to tight ends coach on April 13, 2021.

Head coaching record

References

1970 births
Living people